And Thou Shalt Trust... the Seer is the first full-length album by the German symphonic metal band Haggard. It was released on 15 October 1997 by Last Episode. The painting of the cover is Melencolia I by Albrecht Dürer. The album was re-released as a vinyl record in 2008 by Nattvind Records.

Track listing

Credits
Asis Nasseri – vocals, grunts, guitars
Luz Marsen – drums, kettledrums
Andi Nad – bass guitar
Danny Klupp – guitars, acoustic guitars
Karin Bodenmüller – soprano
Sasema – soprano
Florian Schnellinger – bass vocals
Hans Wolf – piano, cembalo, keyboards
Kathrin Pechlof – harp
Kerstin Krainer – violin
Steffi Hertz – viola
Kathrin Hertz – violoncello
Christoph V. Zastrow – flute
Robert Müller – clarinet
Florian Bartl – oboe
Fiffi Fuhrmann – crumhorn

References

External links
 And Thou Shalt Trust... the Seer at Encyclopaedia Metallum

Haggard (band) albums
1997 debut albums